Paul Heyman (born September 11, 1965) is an American professional wrestling manager, former promoter, photographer, and executive. He is currently signed to WWE, where he is appearing on the SmackDown brand as the "special counsel" and the "wise man" for Undisputed WWE Universal Champion Roman Reigns.

Born in The Bronx to a family of Holocaust survivors, Heyman debuted in the professional wrestling business in 1986. He was the CEO and known as the creative force behind the Extreme Championship Wrestling (ECW) promotion from 1993 until its closure in 2001. Before running and owning ECW, he was a manager under the ring name Paul E. Dangerously in World Championship Wrestling (WCW) and other promotions. He is the co-owner of the Looking4Larry Agency in New York City, and was personally named one of Advertising Age Top 100 Global Marketers.

In WWE, Heyman has managed or has served as manager for a record six world champions: The Big Show, Kurt Angle, Rob Van Dam, CM Punk, Brock Lesnar and Roman Reigns. Critics have praised his abilities at managing and on the microphone. Heyman has also competed sporadically in matches, including the WWE Championship main event of the 2002 Rebellion pay-per-view.

Early life
Heyman was born on September 11, 1965, in The Bronx, New York City, the son of Sulamita (née Szarf; 1928–2009) and Richard S. Heyman (1926–2013), a prominent personal injury attorney and World War II veteran. He is Jewish; his mother was a Holocaust survivor who suffered through experiences in Auschwitz, Bergen-Belsen, and the Łódź Ghetto. By age 11, he was running a mail order business selling celebrity and sports memorabilia from his home. While still a teenager, he fast-talked his way backstage at a World Wide Wrestling Federation (WWWF) event at Madison Square Garden as a photojournalist. He was paid by the company for several of his photographs. He graduated from Edgemont High School. He attended SUNY Purchase and worked on-air as an opinionated, controversial host at SUNY's radio station and the WARY-FM New York radio station for Westchester Community College; in 1985, at the age of 19, he became a photographer, then a producer and promoter for the New York City nightclub Studio 54.

Professional wrestling career

Early career (1987–1988)
Heyman decided he wanted to work in professional wrestling when he saw Vince McMahon interviewing Superstar Billy Graham. He began as a photographer when he was 13 and bought his own photo lab to take photos of pro wrestlers in New York. He published his own newsletter, The Wrestling Times Magazine, and wrote for third-party wrestling publications such as Pro Wrestling Illustrated. At the age of 14, he called Capitol Wrestling Corporation, the parent company of the World Wide Wrestling Federation, and obtained a backstage pass for Madison Square Garden, his first official work in pro wrestling.  Posed photographs from this period of Heyman with the WWF's three dominant heel managers of the period, Lou Albano, Fred Blassie and The Grand Wizard were later published by Pro Wrestling Illustrated as evidence that Heyman had studied heel management under the tutelage of the "Three Wise Men." Heyman met Dusty Rhodes at a Jim Crockett Promotions taping, when he entered a production meeting. In 1985, Heyman was hired by New York Studio 54 as a photographer. The same year, he became producer of Studio 54 and hosted the first Wrestle Party 85 show. He called Jim Crockett, who sent Ric Flair, Dusty Rhodes and Magnum T. A. The show featured Bam Bam Bigelow's debut and an award to Flair.

At the urging of Bigelow, Heyman made his managerial debut on January 2, 1987, initially appearing on the Northeast independent circuit before moving to a more high-profile stint with Championship Wrestling from Florida in February 1987. There, he joined forces with Kevin Sullivan and Oliver Humperdink, and acquired the name Paul E. Dangerously because of his resemblance to Michael Keaton's character in Johnny Dangerously. After CWF was absorbed by Jim Crockett Promotions, Bigelow brought him to Memphis and the Continental Wrestling Association (CWA) to manage Tommy Rich and Austin Idol in a heated feud with Jerry Lawler, a war which later carried over to the American Wrestling Association (AWA), with the Midnight Express (Dennis Condrey and Randy Rose) taking over for Idol and the face-turned Rich.

The Paul E. Dangerously gimmick was an extension of Heyman's own personality: a brash New Yorker with a yuppie attitude, often seen holding a mobile phone, which was occasionally used as a "foreign object" (according to Heyman, he decided to use the mobile phone as a weapon when he watched Gordon Gekko in Wall Street). After departing the AWA, Heyman went back to the CWA. Heyman joined with Eddie Gilbert and his wife and valet Missy Hyatt and together they feuded with Lawler before moving on to the Alabama-based Continental Wrestling Federation. Behind the scenes, Gilbert was the head booker of the promotion, and Heyman became his assistant. Heyman was also the head booker for Windy City Wrestling in Chicago and started developing a reputation as being an innovative television writer and producer.

National Wrestling Alliance/World Championship Wrestling (1988–1993)

In 1988, Heyman jumped to Jim Crockett Promotions, where Dangerously again managed the Original Midnight Express in a feud with the new Midnight Express (Bobby Eaton and Stan Lane) and their manager, Jim Cornette, as well as managing "Mean" Mark Callous. He settled into the role of an announcer, joining Jim Ross to call the matches on WTBS' World Championship Wrestling and other programming. Heyman admitted he learned more working with Ross than from his previous mentors. While in-between stints in WCW, Heyman went to work for ICW as a writer, but was fired on his first day in the middle of his first TV taping.

In 1991, WCW needed to re-structure its "heels", so Heyman returned to the role of spokesman and ringside manager as the manager of the Dangerous Alliance, with Rick Rude as the centerpiece of the stable. According to Heyman, he and Stone Cold Steve Austin learned their craft from Rude. Heyman led Rude to the United States title and the Anderson-Eaton tag team to the Tag Team titles. The Dangerous Alliance dominated WCW through most of 1992.

Eastern Championship Wrestling/Extreme Championship Wrestling (1993–2001)

After departing WCW, Heyman attempted to start a new promotion in Texas with Jim Crockett, Jr. Disagreement arose, however, as Crockett wanted to build a traditional wrestling brand, while Heyman believed traditional wrestling was antiquated and a new take on the genre was needed.

At this time, Eddie Gilbert was a booker for a Philadelphia-based promotion, National Wrestling Alliance (NWA)'s Eastern Championship Wrestling, which he did under the ownership of a local pawn shop owner named Tod Gordon. Heyman came in to help Gilbert teach the younger wrestlers how to perform on interviews, but Gilbert's erratic behavior became too much for Gordon, who had a major falling out with Gilbert right before the UltraClash event on September 18, 1993. From that point forward, Heyman was in charge of the creative direction of the company. As Paul E. Dangerously, he managed a few wrestlers, including Sabu and 911.

A year later, the company was the flagship promotion of the struggling NWA. The NWA World Title Tournament was scheduled to be held in August 1994 for the NWA World Heavyweight Championship, at an ECW-hosted event mostly featuring ECW wrestlers. The proposed outcome was the current ECW champion Shane Douglas becoming champion, but Heyman conspired with Douglas and Gordon without the knowledge of NWA president Dennis Coralluzzo to have Douglas (and by extension, ECW itself) publicly denounce the NWA and its "tradition" after winning the tournament. In his post-match speech, Douglas aggressively assaulted the title's lineage, throwing the belt itself down, proclaiming the NWA a "dead organization" and declaring his ECW title a world-level championship. The plan for this shoot screwjob was known only to those three.

That same week, Heyman and Tod Gordon rechristened the promotion, eliminating the regional branding "Eastern" and declaring the promotion Extreme Championship Wrestling. They broke the company away from the NWA, and ECW became its own entity. Heyman encouraged wrestlers to express their true feelings about the WWF, the NWA, and WCW. In May 1995, Heyman bought out Gordon and became sole owner of ECW. During his time in ECW, Heyman found an ally in Vince McMahon's WWF. McMahon had sent some WWF wrestlers to ECW (under WWF payroll) to develop them and was interested in some ECW wrestlers, such as Terry Gordy and 2 Cold Scorpio. McMahon paid Heyman $1,000 per week to rent Scorpio. Heyman also acknowledged how an effort to put ECW on the USA Network failed after USA Network President Steven Chau became aware of an email Vince McMahon sent which pressured him and other network executives to put ECW on the USA Network.
 
In the final days of ECW, Heyman became persona non grata as he did not appear on the show and was replaced as the leader of the backstage and creative by ECW wrestler Tommy Dreamer. Heyman could not get out of financial trouble and ECW closed on April 4, 2001. Heyman also supposedly had never told his wrestlers that the company was on its dying legs and was unable to pay them for a while.
ECW entered into bankruptcy in 2001 (just weeks after WCW was sold to WWF for $2 million, after AOL Time Warner wrote off over $100 million in debt), with the company $7 million in arrears, with over $3 million owed to the company by InDemand pay per view. On January 28, 2003, World Wrestling Entertainment Inc. purchased ECW's assets from HHG Corporation in court, acquiring the rights to ECW's video library.

World Wrestling Federation/World Wrestling Entertainment/WWE

Commentator and writer (2001–2003)
Heyman became a commentator for the WWF on Raw Is War, replacing Jerry Lawler who had quit due to a dispute when his wife The Kat was fired in February 2001. During that time, he resumed his storyline rivalry with Jim Ross. In July, while retaining his commentator role, Heyman recreated ECW as a stable, which then immediately merged with Shane McMahon's WCW to form the Alliance during the Invasion angle. Heyman was "fired" following the 2001 Survivor Series when the Alliance lost a winner takes all match that marked the end of the invasion angle. Heyman was replaced on Raw commentary by the returning Jerry Lawler.

Heyman was the lead writer for SmackDown! from July 2002 to February 2003. On Heyman's 2014 WWE documentary Ladies and Gentleman, My Name is Paul Heyman, Heyman stated that the SmackDown! brand he was writing was beating Raw in ratings, merchandise and live show attendance during a time McMahon wanted real-life competition between the Raw and SmackDown! brands.

Managing Brock Lesnar (2002–2003)
While he was in WWE, Tazz spoke to him about Brock Lesnar, a WWE developmental wrestler. Heyman began mentoring Lesnar, and McMahon decided to make Heyman Lesnar's manager. Heyman helped Lesnar capture the WWE Undisputed Championship 126 days after Lesnar's main roster debut when Lesnar beat The Rock at SummerSlam to also become the youngest WWE Undisputed Champion at the time. At the Survivor Series, Heyman turned on Lesnar and allied himself with Big Show, while helping him win the title from Lesnar in the process.

SmackDown! general manager (2003–2004)
After McMahon defeated his daughter Stephanie in October 2003 at the No Mercy pay-per-view, the storyline was that she was forced to resign from her position as general manager (GM) of SmackDown!. Heyman returned to television to assume Stephanie McMahon's on-camera role as General Manager. On March 22, 2004, he appeared on Raw to take part in the annual WWE draft lottery. During the show he was drafted to the Raw brand to work for Raw general manager Eric Bischoff. Instead, he decided to "quit" rather than work for Bischoff, the man he cited for the death of ECW by raiding its talent. Heyman was replaced as SmackDown! General Manager by his former client Kurt Angle on March 25.

Ohio Valley Wrestling (2005–2006)
On July 10, 2005, it was reported that Heyman took over the positions of head booker and writer in Ohio Valley Wrestling, a developmental territory maintained by WWE. It was during this time that he forged a real-life friendship with CM Punk.

Return of ECW and departure (2005–2006)

On May 23, 2005, Heyman returned in a segment with Vince McMahon and Eric Bischoff announcing ECW One Night Stand, with Heyman in charge. On the May 22, 2006 episode of Raw, Heyman appeared as ECW Representative promoting ECW One Night Stand. On May 25, 2006, it was announced that ECW would relaunch, as a third WWE brand. Heyman was in charge of the new brand on-camera but had minimal creative input off-camera as well. On the May 29 episode of Raw, during a face-off with Mick Foley, Heyman announced that he was granted a draft pick from both Raw and SmackDown! by Vince McMahon. His Raw draft pick was former ECW wrestler (and Money in the Bank contract holder) Rob Van Dam, and his SmackDown! draft pick was Kurt Angle. Heyman predicted that Van Dam would defeat John Cena at ECW One Night Stand for the WWE Championship and then declare himself the new ECW World Heavyweight Champion.

At ECW One Night Stand, Van Dam defeated Cena to win the WWE Championship. After Cena knocked an ECW referee unconscious, Edge (in a disguise) appeared and speared Cena through a table, before taking out SmackDown! referee Nick Patrick, allowing Van Dam to hit the Five-Star Frog Splash on Cena. With no referee available Heyman ran down the aisle to count the pin fall. The following night on Raw, Heyman confirmed that because the championship match was contested under "ECW rules" (which meant, essentially, there were no rules) that the decision stood and Van Dam was the "Undisputed" WWE Champion. As the WWE Champion, Van Dam was the number one man in the reformed ECW, so on the debut of ECW on Sci Fi the next night Heyman, announced as an "ECW Representative", presented him with the re-instated ECW World Heavyweight Championship. Van Dam elected to keep both title belts and was recognized as both the WWE Champion and ECW World Heavyweight Champion. On the July 4 episode of ECW, Heyman helped Big Show defeat Van Dam for the ECW World Heavyweight Championship.

At the Raw/ECW taping in South Carolina in December 2006, it was announced that Vince McMahon had sent Heyman home, citing "slumping television ratings and a disgruntled talent roster as causes for Mr. Heyman's dismissal". Heyman was escorted from the Coliseum and sent home. He was also immediately pulled from ECW's creative team after the altercation. McMahon was attempting to put the blame on Heyman for the poorly received pay-per-view, and after a meeting with Vince and Stephanie McMahon, Heyman legitimately left WWE but remained under contract. Heyman was against the decision of Bobby Lashley being booked to win the ECW World Championship, and instead wanted to have CM Punk win it, a decision McMahon disliked.  this was the factor that was caused due to a behind-the-scenes dispute of creative disagreements between Heyman and McMahon that led to the split, and that Heyman had been overruled on a number of decisions regarding the product over ECW's only pay-per-view under WWE, December to Dismember. McMahon and Heyman clashed in front of several members of the writing team on McMahon's corporate jet the day after the pay-per-view. The argument with McMahon was over a disagreement over the Extreme Elimination Chamber match at December to Dismember. Heyman thought that Big Show should be eliminated in the Elimination Chamber match by CM Punk via submission, to push the rising star. Big Show agreed with this idea, wanting to help push Punk's career, but McMahon disagreed, and Punk was ultimately eliminated first. After allegedly turning down an offer from Stephanie McMahon to return to his post writing television for WWE developmental television shows, Heyman officially parted ways quietly with WWE on December 17, 2006.

Paul Heyman Guys (2012–2014) 

After a five-year absence following the controversial departure after the December to Dismember PPV in 2006, Heyman returned to WWE on the May 7, 2012 episode of Raw as Brock Lesnar's legal advisor, announcing that Lesnar, who returned a month before had quit the company. Behind the scenes, Heyman had no interest at first in returning to WWE, as he still felt he held bad blood with a lot of the staff, but reconsidered after Lesnar requested his presence after a lackluster promo with John Laurinaitis. The following week on Raw, Heyman confronted Triple H, handing him a lawsuit from Lesnar for breaching of contract. Triple H responded by shoving Heyman into the ropes, leading Heyman to announce that he would file a lawsuit against Triple H for assault and battery. On the June 18 episode of Raw, Heyman declined Triple H's challenge for a match against Lesnar at SummerSlam on Lesnar's behalf. Later that month, Heyman stated that Brock Lesnar would answer Triple H's challenge himself at Raw 1000. Lesnar would go on to defeat Triple H at SummerSlam.

On the September 3 episode of Raw, after CM Punk attacked John Cena, Heyman was seen driving the car Punk had entered. This began an alliance between CM Punk and Heyman. Heyman began accompanying Punk to the ring for his matches and promos. Because of the events of the previous weeks, on the February 11 episode of Raw, Heyman addressed the audience intending to resign from the company. CM Punk, however, convinced Heyman to not only stay with the company, but also to be in Punk's corner at the upcoming Elimination Chamber pay-per-view for his WWE Championship match. Around this time, Heyman quietly cut off his signature ponytail.

Later, CM Punk earned the right to fight The Undertaker at WrestleMania 29 after winning a Fatal Four Way match at Old School Raw. In addition, Heyman's other client Brock Lesnar was booked for a No Holds Barred match against Triple H at WrestleMania, with Triple H's career on the line. At WrestleMania, both of Heyman's clients lost their matches. On the April 15 episode of Raw, Heyman announced Lesnar had challenged Triple H to a steel cage match at Extreme Rules. The following week, Triple H accepted the match and delivered a Pedigree to Heyman. As a response, Lesnar and Heyman invaded the headquarters of WWE and trashed Triple H's office. At Extreme Rules, Lesnar defeated Triple H with the help of Heyman.

Heyman announced Michael McGillicutty as the newest "Paul Heyman guy" on the May 20 Raw and gave him the new name of Curtis Axel. On the May 27 episode of Raw, Heyman appeared on the Highlight Reel with Chris Jericho, where Jericho challenged CM Punk to a match at Payback which Heyman accepted on Punk's behalf. The next week, Heyman and Jericho signed the contract to make it official. The same week on SmackDown, Jericho faced off against Curtis Axel. As Jericho was closing in on the victory, Heyman stood on the announcers table and yelled: "It's clobbering time". Punk's music began to play, distracting Jericho long enough for Axel to pick up the victory.

At Payback, Heyman coached Axel during his match with Wade Barrett and The Miz for the Intercontinental Championship with Axel winning the match and the title. Heyman accompanied Punk to the ring later in the show for his match with Chris Jericho. After Payback, a WWE.com exclusive video aired with Punk telling Heyman that he is his friend and not his client. On the June 17 episode of Raw, Punk challenged Alberto Del Rio, mentioning that he did not want Heyman managing him anymore. Following Punk's match, he was attacked by Lesnar. The next week on Raw, Punk demanded answers from Heyman, who swore he did not ask Lesnar to attack him. Punk forgave Heyman and then faced Darren Young and, following his win, was attacked by Titus O'Neil until Curtis Axel saved him, to Punk's chagrin. Heyman announced that he would team with Axel against The Prime Time Players the next week, again to Punk's disapproval.

At Money in the Bank, Heyman betrayed CM Punk, costing him his chance at the Money in the Bank briefcase by hitting him three times with a ladder, knocking Punk off the ladder when he was ascending. On the August 5 episode of Raw, Punk retaliated by choking Heyman while Heyman was in Curtis Axel's corner during a match. This prompted Lesnar to enter the ring and attack Punk. Heyman later challenged Punk to a 1-on-1 match for the next week's Raw, which Punk accepted. However, this was revealed to be a trap when Lesnar appeared prior to the match. The plan was foiled, however, when Heyman dared CM Punk to come into the ring and accept the challenge as CM Punk, who had anticipated the trap and hid under the ring, emerged and attacked Lesnar. However, Punk failed to get his hands on Heyman as Curtis Axel came to Heyman's aid. This led to a match between Lesnar and Punk at SummerSlam, which Lesnar won after interference from Heyman.

Heyman and Axel delivered a brutal assault to Punk on Raw the following week, with Heyman breaking a kendo stick over Punk's back while Punk was handcuffed. Heyman was then booked to team with Axel against CM Punk in an elimination handicap match at Night of Champions. Heyman tried various times to get out of the match, which caused General Manager Brad Maddox to make the match into a no disqualification elimination handicap match. At Night of Champions, Punk eliminated Axel (who had been forced to defend his Intercontinental Championship against Kofi Kingston earlier in the night), leaving Heyman alone with Punk. After receiving a beating from Punk and being placed in handcuffs, just as Heyman did to Punk weeks before, Punk was about to attack Heyman with a kendo stick when Ryback interfered and cost Punk the match by putting Punk through a table.

At Battleground, Punk pinned Ryback after a low blow. At Hell in a Cell, Punk defeated both Ryback and Heyman and after the match attacked Heyman on top of the cell, putting an end to their feud. On the November 11, 2013 episode of Raw, Heyman stated that he was no longer with Ryback as Ryback never officially accepted his proposal to become a "Paul Heyman Guy". After that, CM Punk came out to once again beat Heyman with a kendo stick. The following night on SmackDown, Heyman formally announced to Curtis Axel and Ryback that they were no longer Paul Heyman guys, therefore marking the end of Axel's association with Heyman as he continued to team with Ryback. Heyman returned on the December 30 episode of Raw alongside Brock Lesnar, who attacked Mark Henry. He stood by Lesnar as he feuded with Big Show and The Undertaker in the first four months of 2013. Lesnar ended The Undertaker's undefeated streak at WrestleMania XXX; this was Undertaker's first loss at a WrestleMania, as he previously had a record of 21 wins. On the Raw following WrestleMania, Cesaro revealed himself to be a "Paul Heyman Guy". Cesaro eventually declared himself no longer a "Paul Heyman Guy" on the July 21 episode of Raw.

Lesnar's sole managership (2014–2020) 

After Triple H announced that Randy Orton would challenge John Cena at SummerSlam, Roman Reigns came out and fought with Orton backstage. Heyman then came out and told Triple H to implement "Plan C" which was the return of Lesnar, who would have a match against Cena at SummerSlam. Lesnar defeated Cena at SummerSlam to win the WWE World Heavyweight Championship.

At the Royal Rumble, Heyman was at ringside when Lesnar retained his WWE World Heavyweight Championship against Cena and Seth Rollins. At WrestleMania 31 Heyman was at ringside when Lesnar defended his WWE World Heavyweight Championship against the 2015 Royal Rumble winner Roman Reigns, but Lesnar was unsuccessful as Rollins cashed in his Money in the Bank briefcase and made the match a Triple Threat match. Rollins pinned Reigns for the win. The next night on Raw, Lesnar was suspended after he demanded a rematch for the title and attacked several innocent people.

In June, Heyman and Lesnar returned to the WWE after Lesnar was named the No. 1 contender to the WWE World Heavyweight Championship, igniting a feud between Lesnar and Rollins. At Battleground, Lesnar defeated Rollins by disqualification, after The Undertaker returned and attacked Lesnar. The Undertaker further explained his actions as revenge not for defeating the streak but over Heyman's constant taunting. At SummerSlam, Heyman was at ringside when the match between Brock Lesnar and The Undertaker ended in controversy; the bell was rung as The Undertaker tapped out, but the referee did not see it. This allowed The Undertaker to defeat Lesnar after he passed out to the Hell's Gate. At Hell in a Cell, Heyman was present when Lesnar defeated Undertaker in the rematch, ending their feud.

Heyman returned with Lesnar on the January 11, 2016 Raw, and was ringside with Lesnar for the Royal Rumble. Lesnar was eliminated in the match by Bray Wyatt, after interference by the rest of The Wyatt Family. He accompanied Lesnar to the ring at WrestleMania 32 with Lesnar defeating Dean Ambrose in a No Holds Barred Street Fight. On July 19 at the 2016 WWE draft, Lesnar and Heyman were drafted to the Raw brand. Heyman returned alongside Lesnar on the August 1 episode of Raw hyping the Lesnar-Orton match at Summerslam while Lesnar took an RKO from Randy Orton. On the October 31 episode of Raw, Heyman and Lesnar confronted Goldberg. Heyman was speared by Goldberg and later taken by ambulance to a hospital in Hartford, Connecticut. On the July 31 episode of Raw, Heyman appeared with Lesnar to announce to acting authority figure Kurt Angle that should Lesnar lose the championship at SummerSlam, they will both depart from the company. At Summerslam, Lesnar defeated Roman Reigns, Samoa Joe, and Braun Strowman in a Fatal 4-Way to retain the Universal Championship.

At Extreme Rules, Kurt Angle said that if Lesnar, the then-reigning Universal Champion, did not show up for Raw or agree to the terms of when Lesnar will defend the championship, then he would be stripped of the championship. On July 16, 2018, episode of Raw, Heyman interrupted Angle, who was about to strip Lesnar, and stated that Lesnar would hold on to the championship for however long he pleases. Angle then scheduled Lesnar to defend the championship at SummerSlam and if he did not, he would be indefinitely stripped. On the July 30 episode of Raw, Angle threatened Heyman's employment due to Lesnar's refusal to leave the backstage area and appear in the ring. After several failed attempts by Heyman to convince Lesnar to appear in the ring, Lesnar attacked Angle with an F-5 and choked Heyman. Two weeks later on the August 13, 2018 episode of Raw, Heyman revealed it was all a ruse as both Heyman (wielding pepper spray) and Lesnar ambushed Reigns. Heyman would accompany Lesnar going into SummerSlam, where Lesnar's 504 days reign as champion would come to an end after Lesnar was pinned by Reigns. Heyman would appear in a segment backstage the Raw after SummerSlam to invoke Lesnar's rematch clause against Roman Reigns for the Universal Championship at Hell in a Cell, but the rematch was denied by Kurt Angle. However, at Hell in a Cell, Heyman appeared as Lesnar interfered with the main event match between Roman Reigns and Braun Strowman. The next day, Heyman appeared on Raw, setting up a triple threat match at Crown Jewel between Brock Lesnar, Braun Strowman, and Roman Reigns for the Universal Championship. However, following Reigns' leukemia announcement, Heyman would instead set up a singles match between Lesnar and Strowman for the now-vacant title at Crown Jewel, a match Lesnar won.

At WrestleMania 35, Heyman came out just after the opening segment, demanding that Seth Rollins fights his client to start off the main card. Lesnar and Rollins appeared thereafter. Lesnar then severely beat up Rollins, before the match started. When the match finally started, Rollins ultimately won the match in under 5 minutes, carrying out a low blow when a referee was knocked down, and executing his finisher three times.

In June 2019, WWE announced that Heyman would be the executive director of Raw. Heyman also appeared on SmackDown due to Lesnar being drafted to the brand in the 2019 WWE Draft in October, but shortly thereafter, Lesnar returned to Raw. On June 11, 2020, it was reported that Heyman had been removed from the executive director position of Raw, in an effort to streamline both the Raw and SmackDown writing teams into one group being led by Bruce Prichard. However, Heyman was expected to maintain his on-screen role as the advocate for Brock Lesnar.

Heyman continued to represent Lesnar up to WrestleMania 36, when Drew McIntyre defeated him for the WWE Championship in quick fashion, at a fan-less event, due to the COVID-19 pandemic. Lesnar then opted not to sign a new contract, thus leaving his professional wrestling career in uncertainty due to him becoming a "free agent".

Special Counsel (2020–present) 

On the August 28, 2020 episode of SmackDown, Heyman aligned with the returning Roman Reigns portraying the character of his special counsel. After Lesnar's return to WWE at SummerSlam in August 2021, At the Crown Jewel event in October, Reigns retained the Universal Championship after striking Lesnar with the title belt. Heyman's alliance with Reigns ended on the December 17, 2021 episode of Smackdown after Reigns fired Heyman and attacked him. As Reigns was about to hit him with a steel chair, Lesnar saved him from being attacked.

On the January 3, 2022 episode of Raw, Heyman once again aligned himself with Lesnar after he had won the WWE Championship two days earlier at Day 1. The reunion was short-lived, as three weeks later at the Royal Rumble event, Heyman betrayed Lesnar by handing Reigns the WWE Championship belt to attack Lesnar, allowing Bobby Lashley to win the title from him in the process and re-aligning him with Reigns. Lesnar went on to win the Royal Rumble match and regained the WWE Championship at Elimination Chamber, setting up a Champion vs. Champion Winner Takes All Championship Unification match match against Reigns at WrestleMania 38. At WrestleMania 38 Reigns defeated Lesnar thus winning both Universal and WWE Championships.

Legacy 
Heyman's work as a promoter and booker has been praised by many wrestling fellows and critics. Former ECW World Heavyweight Champion Raven called him "the most creative genius the business has ever seen", Another former ECW World Heavyweight Champion Tazz also referred to Heyman as a "genius",  while former WWE commentator and manager Jim Cornette referred to him as "a genius". Heyman is widely regarded as one of the greatest orators in professional wrestling history.

Heyman, however, has been noted for being a difficult personality and has had several feuds with wrestlers, including A.J. Styles and Gallows and Anderson. Former ECW wrestler Tommy Dreamer has spoken about how he planned to assassinate Heyman at WrestleMania X-Seven due to Heyman's financial mistreatment of Dreamer.

Professional wrestling promoter and booker Eric Bischoff has praised and been critical of Heyman, stating "the idea of working with Paul wasn’t going to make me go ‘ooh wow, I wonder what that’s going to be like’. And we didn't always get along all that great by the way. We weren't adversarial or anything like that just he was doing his thing, I was doing mine kind of thing.” “By the time I got to WWE and WCW was no more, and ECW was no more, and we were both talents at WWE, Paul and I spent a lot of time talking, creatively and historically and just our general feeling of things, and developed a great relationship. We kinda kept it kayfabe, because we never knew when we might have an opportunity to make some money together, so we kinda wanted people to buy into the ‘Heyman hates Bischoff’, ‘Bischoff hates Heyman’ story but it wasn't true at all".

In 2021, legendary professional wrestling commentator Jim Ross, who worked with Heyman in WCW and WWE and was Heyman's former broadcast partner in the WWE, praised Heyman stating "He’s just so damn smart and he gets it. He knew what the hell he was doing. He was a really good antagonist because sometimes the best antagonists are the villains that say things that you know are true but you just don’t want to hear them. Heyman had the ability to tell his version of the truth, [he was] plausible. He just wasn’t a heel getting himself over, he got talent over and did a great job”.

Other media and endeavors
Heyman is the co-founder of the award-winning New York City firm The Looking4Larry Agency. The firm broke new ground with its initial campaign with Electronic Arts, THQ video games, 2K Sports, the Hard Rock Hotel, and Casino Las Vegas. Heyman also worked with Brock Lesnar, collaborating with him on Lesnar's autobiography, Death Clutch: My Story of Determination, Domination, and Survival. He has appeared in the video games WWE Day of Reckoning, WWE SmackDown! vs. Raw, WWE 2K14, WWE 2K15, WWE 2K16, WWE 2K17, WWE 2K18, WWE 2K19, WWE 2K20, WWE 2K22 and WWE 2K23.

Heyman portrayed a sports announcer in 2002's Rollerball. and an uncredited role in the WWE film Countdown. After a family emergency forced the original actor to pull out, he was chosen by I Am Legend executive producer Michael Tadross to play "Gino" in the film adaptation of the long-running Off-Broadway show Tony n' Tina's Wedding.

Personal life
Heyman is a father of two children.

In February 1993, Heyman filed a lawsuit against WCW alleging wrongful termination and ethnic discrimination. The lawsuit was settled privately out of court.

Outside the ring, Heyman is a film enthusiast citing Léon: The Professional and Angels with Dirty Faces as his favorite films. Heyman has also said he's a great admirer of Henry Rollins, describing him as "one of the most underrated social commentators out there".
 
Heyman suffers from insomnia.

Awards and accomplishments 
 Pro Wrestling Illustrated
 Faction of the Year (2022) – with The Bloodline
 Manager of the Year (1992)
 Wrestling Observer Newsletter
 Best Color Commentator (1991)
 Best Booker (1994–1997, 2002)
 Best on Interviews (2013–2014)
 Best Non-Wrestler (2001, 2002, 2004, 2012–2014, 2018-2022)
 Best Non-Wrestler of the Decade (2010s)
 Best on Interviews of the Decade (2010s)
 Most Disgusting Promotional Tactic (2012)Angle with CM Punk, exploiting Jerry Lawler's real-life heart attack, playing footage of him near death
 Wrestling Observer Newsletter Hall of Fame (Class of 2005)
Inside The Ropes Magazine
 Manager of the Year (2020)
 WWE
 Year-End Award for Best on the Mic (2018)

References

External links

 

 
 Heyman Hustle Official Website

1965 births
21st-century American Jews
American color commentators
American male professional wrestlers
American male television writers
American photographers
American sports businesspeople
American television writers
Edgemont Junior – Senior High School alumni
Jewish American screenwriters
Jewish professional wrestlers
Living people
People from Scarsdale, New York
Professional wrestlers from New York (state)
Professional wrestling announcers
Professional wrestling managers and valets
Professional wrestling promoters
Professional wrestling trainers
Professional wrestling writers
Screenwriters from New York (state)
Sportspeople from the Bronx
The Dangerous Alliance members
WWE executives
Professional wrestlers from New York City